Jacob Hveding was a Norwegian lawyer. From 1772 to 1786 he was Prime Minister of the Faroe Islands. Later, he moved back to Norway, and Stavanger, where he took over as a presiding judge.

References
Løgtingið 150 - Hátíðarrit. Tórshavn 2002, Bind 2, S. 366. (Avsnitt Føroya løgmenn fram til 1816) (PDF-Download )

Year of birth missing
Year of death missing
Norwegian judges
Prime Ministers of the Faroe Islands